Charra may refer to:
 Charra, South Australia, a locality west of Ceduna
 Charra Airfield, an abandoned airfield in West Bengal, India
 Chharra Rafatpur, Uttar Pradesh, India is sometimes spelled Charra

See also
Chara
Charla (name)